The Josephus Daniels House, also known as Wakestone, and later the Masonic Temple of Raleigh, was a historic mansion at 1520 Caswell Street in Raleigh, North Carolina.  Built in 1920, it was the home until his death in 1948 of Josephus Daniels, Secretary of the Navy under President Woodrow Wilson, and a major force in the development of the modern 20th-century United States Navy.  It was declared a National Historic Landmark in 1976. After Daniels' death it was purchased by the local Freemasons, who made additions to the building and continued to use it as their meeting hall into the 21st century. The building was demolished in August 2021 to make way for a new development of high end homes.

Description and history
The former Daniels House was named Wakestone by Josephus' wife, Addie Worth Bagley Daniels. It stands in a residential area north of downtown Raleigh, on a  landscaped parcel bounded on the east by Glenwood Avenue (United States Route 70), on the south by Wade Avenue, and on the west by Caswell Street, where the main drive enters the property.  The property is separated from other residential properties to the north by a hedgerow.  The house is oriented facing west, with a curving drive providing access to parking areas to the west and south (formerly the sites of gardens kept by the Danielses).  The house is a -story stone structure, roughly U-shaped, with a rectangular main block and two wings extending eastward to the rear.  The area between the two rear wings has been filled in and extended further east with a large meeting space added by the Masons in the 1950s.  This addition is built of similar stone to the main house, and does not detract from the view of the house as seen from the front.

The front facade of the house is dominated by a four-column neoclassical Greek portico, its columns capped by Egyptian capitals, and supporting a fully pedimented gable.  The main entrance is flanked by sidelight windows and pilasters, which rise to an architrave and an iron-balustraded balcony for the second floor.  The interior of the house retains many fine finishes, although some of its upstairs bedrooms have been converted into meeting spaces, and much of the eastern outer wall was removed to provide access to the large meeting wing.

Josephus Daniels, for whom the house was built in 1920, was one of the most important US Secretaries of the Navy in the 20th century, serving from 1913 to 1921 under President Woodrow Wilson.  Daniels brought the Navy to a wartime footing during World War I, and oversaw many improvements and reforms in its operations and practices.  He provided educational opportunities for poor and illiterate personnel, provided for the enlistment of women, banned alcohol from the officer's mess, and combatted collusive bidding practices in government contracting.  He later served as United States Ambassador to Mexico, where he antagonized American oil interests by refusing to promote their agenda.

In February 2021, the Raleigh City Council voted to revoke the property's historic landmark status, reportedly due to its association with Josephus Daniels, the News & Observer newspaper and the Wilmington insurrection of 1898. The house was bought on 10 March 2021 by Beacon Street Caswell LLC and was torn down in August 2021.

See also
List of National Historic Landmarks in North Carolina
National Register of Historic Places listings in Wake County, North Carolina
Josephus Daniels biographical page

References

National Historic Landmarks in North Carolina
National Register of Historic Places in Raleigh, North Carolina
Houses completed in 1920
Houses in Raleigh, North Carolina
Masonic buildings in North Carolina
Houses on the National Register of Historic Places in North Carolina
Clubhouses on the National Register of Historic Places in North Carolina
Demolished buildings and structures in North Carolina
Buildings and structures demolished in 2021